Primary is a 1960 American direct cinema documentary film about the 1960 Democratic Party primary election in Wisconsin between John F. Kennedy and Hubert Humphrey, part of their quest to be chosen as the United States Democratic Party's candidate for President of the United States in the general election.

Produced by Robert Drew and shot by Richard Leacock, D. A. Pennebaker, Terence Macartney-Filgate, and Albert Maysles, the film was a breakthrough in documentary film style. Most importantly, through the use of mobile cameras and lighter sound equipment, the filmmakers were able to follow the candidates as they wound their way through cheering crowds, cram with them into cars and crowded hotel rooms, and hover around their faces as they awaited polling results. This resulted in a greater intimacy than was possible with the older, more classical techniques of documentary filmmaking, and it established what has since become the standard style of video reporting.

In 1990, the film was selected for preservation in the United States National Film Registry by the Library of Congress as being "culturally, historically, or aesthetically significant". The Academy Film Archive preserved Primary in 1998. The film's importance in the evolution of documentary filmmaking was explored in the film Cinéma Vérité: Defining the Moment.

See also
 U.S. presidential election, 1960
 Direct cinema
 Cultural depictions of John F. Kennedy

References

External links 
 
   Ann Hornaday, "The 34 best political movies ever made" The Washington Post Jan. 23, 2020) ranked #4

Documentary films about elections in the United States
Documentary films about John F. Kennedy
United States National Film Registry films
Hubert Humphrey
1960 documentary films
1960 films
Black-and-white documentary films
American documentary films
Politics of Wisconsin
Films shot in Wisconsin
1960 United States Democratic presidential primaries
1960 in Wisconsin
Films directed by Robert Drew
American black-and-white films
Documentary films about Wisconsin
1960s English-language films
1960s American films